Son frère is a 2003 French film directed by Patrice Chéreau. The screenplay, based on the Philippe Besson 2001 book Son frère (English title His Brother) was written by Chéreau and Anne-Louise Trividic.

Synopsis
Brothers Thomas (Bruno Todeschini) and Luc (Eric Caravaca) have an estranged relationship.  One day, Thomas comes to Luc's apartment explaining that he is ill and asks if Luc will accompany him to the hospital.  Thomas has an undetermined platelet disorder which is treated with cortisone and splenectomy—neither help. Luc, who happens to be gay, and is in a relationship with Vincent (Sylvain Jacques), is viewed by their father as the stronger of the two and wishes it was Luc that were ill, as he could beat the illness.

Thomas's girlfriend, Claire (Nathalie Boutefeu), leaves Thomas when she realizes he only wants his brother Luc around. Luc's relationship with Vincent is also strained as Luc takes Thomas to the family home in Brittany. The film jumps forward in time to allow about 18 months to be covered during the course of the film.  By the end of the film, the brothers reconcile their relationship.

Cast
Bruno Todeschini as Thomas
Eric Caravaca as Luc
Nathalie Boutefeu as Claire
Sylvain Jacques as Vincent
Maurice Garrel as the old man
Catherine Ferran as Head Doctor
Antoinette Moya as the mother
Fred Ulysse as the father
Robinson Stévenin as Manuel

Awards and nominations
Berlin Film Festival (Germany)
Won: Silver Bear - Best Director (Patrice Chéreau)
Nominated: Golden Bear (Patrice Chéreau)
César Awards (France)
Nominated: Best Actor – Leading Role (Bruno Todeschini)
European Film Awards
Nominated: Best Actor – Leading Role (Bruno Todeschini)
Lumiere Awards (France)
Won: Best Actor – Leading Role (Bruno Todeschini)

References

 

2003 films
2000s French-language films
French LGBT-related films
Films directed by Patrice Chéreau
Films featuring a Best Actor Lumières Award-winning performance
2003 LGBT-related films
2000s French films